Atelopus mittermeieri is a species of toad in the family Bufonidae. It is endemic to Colombia.

References

mittermeieri
Amphibians of Colombia
Endemic fauna of Colombia
Amphibians described in 2006